Dave Rat  (born 1962 as David Levine) is the founder of Rat Sound Systems Inc. and Sound Tools LLC, a sound system designer, sound consultant and live sound engineer for many well-known artists such as  the Red Hot Chili Peppers (with whom he worked with from February 1991 to January 2017), Nirvana, Rage Against the Machine, The Offspring, and Blink 182.

Dave Rat writes articles for various professional sound magazines and has been asked to speak at sound conventions and events such as AES. He has designed speakers and sound equipment such as the MicroWedge, which is manufactured by Eastern Acoustic Works and is now a familiar monitor wedge on many worldwide tours.

Dave Rat wrote a column for Live Sound International magazine entitled, "Rat Tales" in the November 2006 issue and another in the May 2007 issue.

On May 22, 2006 Dave Rat started a blog entitled "Roadies In The Midst" on the Rat Sound Systems Inc. website chronicling his experiences as Front of House sound engineer for the Red Hot Chili Peppers on their Stadium Arcadium tour. At the time he had acted as their Front of House (FOH) engineer for the past 19 years. The tour ended in August 2007. However, Dave continues to post entries discussing the adjustment back to normal life.  He went back out as Front of House engineer for the Blink 182 Reunion Tour and likewise chronicled his exploits on that long-running arena and amphitheater tour in 2009. On May 15, 2011, Dave announced through his Twitter page that rehearsals were underway for the upcoming Red Hot Chili Peppers tour, which was expected to last two years.

In December 2005 Dave innovated a unique sound system design based on two side-by-side speaker systems that he called The Double Hung PA. The outer stereo speakers reproduced guitar, bass, toms and cymbals and the inner speakers reproduced vocals, kick and snare.  Since no single instrument or vocal was sent to both systems, comb filtering and interference issues were avoided while system clarity was increased. The Red Hot Chili Peppers toured with the Double Hung System for the duration of their Stadium Arcadium tour. In July 2008, the Brazil-based sound company Gabisom implemented the side-by-side PA concept for the Rock in Rio festival in Portugal and in 2009 Pennsylvania based sound company, Clair Brothers, provided touring artists U2 with an in-the-round stadium sized sound system, based on the same double hung PA concept.

In 2009 Dave began working on several steerable sub woofer array concepts which he implemented on the Blink 182 reunion tour. The Vortex, Slotfire and V-Fire configurations describe methods of arranging and delaying conventional sub woofers such that low frequency sound bleed onto stage is reduced and horizontal subwoofer coverage to the audience is steerable.

Dave worked with Soundgarden in the Summer of 2011 on their North American tour. Following that, Rat again worked with the Red Hot Chili Peppers on their 2011-13 I'm with You World Tour and the band's 2013-14 tour that followed. He again worked with them on their 2016-17 The Getaway World Tour. On January 12, 2017, Rat announced that after nearly 26 years working with the Chili Peppers he would no longer be the sound engineer for the band following their January 21, 2017 show in Minnesota. Rat said "I truly love Flea, Anthony, Chad, Josh and all my dear and close friends I consider family both on the road now and those that have moved on to other adventures over the years. I am pretty happy to say that I have dedicated significant time documenting touring with the Peppers in journals but also have thousands of amazing photos spanning decades of smiles and challenges."

Dave is the holder of two patents, the MicroWedge stage monitor design and the Sound Tools Sniffer/Sender Unit.

References

External links
 Dave Rat's Rat Sound website
 Dave Rat's Twitter page
 Dave Rat's RHCP/Blink 182 Tour Blog
 The Double Hung PA
 Vortex, Slotfire and V-Fire
 Dave Rat site 
 Guitar Center Interview 2007
 Mix website interview with Dave Rat
 SooToday.com Article on Dave Rat's unusual Ebay auction
 Meet Dave Rat commentary on Monkeyfilter.com
 Thermodynamics of a Rock Show
 Polarity to the People
 Don't Kill the Artist
 Sometimes Sound is About Time
 Fighting For Power
 When Hearing Starts To Drift
 Dynamic Versus Compressed
 A PA Evolution Odyssey
 Audio Quiz
 Interview Regarding RHCP Mixing

1962 births
American audio engineers
Date of birth missing (living people)
Living people
People from Huntsville, Alabama